Hussain Jasim Al Nowais (Arabic: حسين جاسم النويس) is an Emirati businessman who serves as Chairman of Al Nowais Investments and AMEA Power; and is the Vice Chairman of Abu Dhabi Commercial Bank. He is also a co-founder and board member of Sandooq Al Watan and board member of Rotana Hotel Management Corporation.

Early life
Hussain Al Nowais was born in Abu Dhabi, United Arab Emirates in 1956. He graduated from Lewis & Clark College in Portland in 1978 with a Bachelor of Arts degree in Business Administration, with an emphasis on finance. He has also attended various Executive Management courses at INSEAD in France and London Business School.

Career

He is the Chairman of Al Nowais Investments LLC, listed on the Forbes Top 100 Arab Family Businesses in the Middle East in 2020 and 2021. Al Nowais Investments' latest project was leading a consortium to build Egypt's renewable energy power plants with a total capacity of 700mw.

He is also the Chairman of AMEA Power which develops thermal and renewable energy in Africa, the Middle East, and Asia. He serves as a Director of Rotana Hotel Management Corporation and is Vice Chairman of Abu Dhabi Commercial Bank. He is a founding board member of Sandooq Al Watan (Nation's Fund) and a founding board of trustees of Khalifa University in UAE. Al Nowais served as Chairman of Waha Capital from 2006 to 2018.

Recognition 
In 2013 MF International Gulf Italy magazine named him among "The people who count in Dubai." In 2011 and in 2013, Arabian Business included him in their "2013 Construction Week Power 100" list.

In June 2021, Faure Gnassingbé, President of Togo, awarded Al Nowais the Order of Mono, the highest Togolese order of chivalry, in recognition of his contributions to Togo’s development process.

References

External links
 

Emirati business executives
People from Abu Dhabi
Lewis & Clark College alumni
Living people
Naturalized citizens of Cyprus
Emirati emigrants to Cyprus
Cypriot businesspeople
1956 births